Des O'Reilly (19 November 1954 – 7 March 2016) was an Australian rugby league footballer who made 127 appearances for the Eastern Suburbs Roosters from 1975 to 1982, and then 13 appearances for Cronulla from 1983 to 1985.

O'Reilly died on the morning of 7 March 2016 after a long illness.

References

1954 births
2016 deaths
Rugby league players from Sydney
Sydney Roosters players
Cronulla-Sutherland Sharks players
New South Wales rugby league team players
Rugby league utility players